Oosterdokseiland (Dutch: "Eastern Dock Island") is an island that forms a neighborhood of Amsterdam, Netherlands just to the east of Amsterdam Centraal railway station.

History 
The nucleus of the island was created in 1832 when the Oosterdok was dammed off from the IJ. It was expanded to its current size when the first railroad was constructed at the site in the 1870s. In the 1960s the main Amsterdam post office was built on the island, which was torn down in 2005.

Current Situation 
The Oosterdokseiland is now home to a mix of public and private users.

References

Neighbourhoods of Amsterdam
Mixed-use developments in the Netherlands